Sidi Yahya Ou Saad is a commune in the Khénifra Province, Béni Mellal-Khénifra, Morocco. At the time of the 2004 census, the commune had a total population of 8559 people living in 1662 households.

References

Populated places in Khénifra Province
Rural communes of Béni Mellal-Khénifra